Edward William Davis (1886 – 10 April 1961) was a politician in Queensland, Australia. He was a Member of the Queensland Legislative Assembly.

Politics 
Davis represented the seat of Barcoo from 1943 till his death in 1961. He was the western district secretary of the Australian Workers' Union before his election, and had previously been an organiser in western Queensland.

References

Members of the Queensland Legislative Assembly
1886 births
1961 deaths
20th-century Australian politicians